"The Lorelei" is a song composed by George Gershwin, with lyrics by Ira Gershwin; it was written for their musical Pardon My English (1933).

It is about the Lorelei legend.

The lyrics of "The Lorelei" are transcribed by Ira Gershwin in Lyrics on Several Occasions.

Notable recordings 
Ella Fitzgerald - Ella Fitzgerald Sings the George and Ira Gershwin Song Book (1959, studio performance)
Ella Fitzgerald - Ella in Berlin: Mack the Knife (1960, live performance)
Liza Minnelli - It Amazes Me (1965)

References

External links 
 Lyrics of "The Lorelei"

Songs with music by George Gershwin
Songs with lyrics by Ira Gershwin
Songs from musicals
Ella Fitzgerald songs
1933 songs